Delta Beta Phi was a small national men's fraternity founded on 1878 at Cornell University, soon forming six chapters. The national disbanded in 1882, but may have been briefly restored through the 1920s.

History
Its four founders were:
J.D. Hamrick
I.W. Kelly
J.S. Monroe
Willard Olney

The original Cornell chapter was cheekily nicknamed the "Dead Bits" on campus on account of the first two letters of its name. It expanded quickly to form six chapters in the Northeastern and Mid-Atlantic states, creating five in its first year. Two of its chapters, Psi and Delta came from earlier, local societies.

Dissolution occurred abruptly in 1882 when the entire society was broken up and appeared to be disbanded; a 1905 history of Cornell gives the fraternity rather short shrift, and is aware only of the original chapter and five successors in its original existence, noting that "[f]rom this time [1876] until 1881 no new chapters appeared at Cornell, if we except Delta Beta Phi, which originated here in 1878, spread  to five other institutions, and after four years ceased  to exist."  An 1880 fraternal publication records that already at that time the fraternity was struggling, describing the Cornell chapter as "disbanded," with the chapter at the University of Pennsylvania seeking to gain recognition by Psi Upsilon, the CCNY chapter likewise petitioning Alpha Delta Phi, and the chapter at Lafayette having "languidly expired."  Meanwhile, Alpha Delta Phi sought to poach the nascent Johns Hopkins chapter by offering them commodious new quarters, with the result nearly assured: "no doubt Delta Beta Phi will be minus a chapter soon," comments the author. Nonetheless, the national fraternity, such as it was, strove still to revive its fortunes, disseminating a circular seeking to recruit men for a chapter at Columbia University, albeit unsuccessfully—indeed, the same publication reported it was "hard at work in establishing new chapters," citing efforts in the South and specifically at the University of Virginia.  The languid desuetude of the Lafayette chapter proved short-lived, as it was soon reported to have survived with eight men.  The CCNY chapter, however, indeed collapsed and dispersed in roughly equal moieties to Alpha Delta Phi and Theta Delta Chi.

As for further developments, according to Baird's 12th edition, Delta chapter at CCNY continued on as a local society for two more years. Later information from the Baird's Archive says this group left Delta Beta Phi in 1881 to join Theta Delta Chi. This information is consistent with the ΘΔΧ online charge list. This chapter appears to have remained active until 1931. The Baird's Archive further goes on to describe the fraternity's reappearance: "Some decades later bona fide yearbooks from Columbia and NYU during the 1920s show this fraternity, claiming up to as many as 25 chapters." The following 17, in an alphabetical list, have been identified:

 Alpha - Cornell University
 Beta - University of Pennsylvania
 Gamma or Pi - Columbia University 1921-193x
 Delta - City University of New York 
 Epsilon - Harvard University
 Iota - DePaul University 192x-193x
 Kappa - New York University
 Mu - Ohio State University
 Nu - Northwestern University
 Omicron - Columbia Dental College
 Pi - Johns Hopkins University
 Rho - University of Washington
 Phi - Lehigh University
 Chi - Crane College 1923-1933 
 Psi - University of Virginia
 Psi Deuteron - Lafayette College
 Omega - Stetson University September 1926

Symbols and publications 
There was a star at each corner of the badge.

The crest was an etching that included an image of the badge at top, displaying other symbolism of the fraternity within a Grecian motif. The crest was in use by the Alpha chapter in the Cornell Cornellian yearbook for the several years it remained active.

The fraternity's colors were garnet and black.

The fraternity began a publication, the Delta Beta Phi Quarterly in 1880 or 1881, but this only existed for a single issue.

Chapters
Baird's Manual (12th edition) lists six chapters formed between 1878 and 1882. Dates given for disbanding of these six are from Baird's or collegiate yearbooks:

Additional chapters, as listed in yearbooks should be added once their years of activity have been clarified.

References

Defunct fraternities and sororities
Student organizations established in 1878
1878 establishments in New York (state)
Cornell University